"Girls Like Girls" is a song recorded by American singer and songwriter Hayley Kiyoko for her second extended play This Side of Paradise. The song was released with a music video as the second single on June 24, 2015, directed by Kiyoko and Austin S. Winchel.

Composition 
"Girls Like Girls" is written by Kiyoko along with Owen Thomas and Lily-May Young; with production handled by James Flannigan. The concept of the song is based around writing about subjects that may not be in the spotlight. In an interview in Us Weekly, Kiyoko stated: "I loved the idea of how all these guys always are stealing other guys’ girls and I was like, ‘There’s no female anthem for a girl stealing another guy's girl,' and that is the coolest thing ever, ['Girls Like Girls' has] become a universal video that brings out different kinds of emotions for different kinds of people."

Music video 

A music video, directed by both Kiyoko and Austin S. Winchell was released in August. It stars her Jem and the Holograms costar Stefanie Scott in the main role of Coley as the love interest of Sonya (played by Kelsey Chow). The music video itself caused a big impact on microblogging website Tumblr and eventually went viral, reaching more than 145 million views.

Synopsis 

The music video follows Coley and Sonya as they realize their love for each other extends beyond friendship. The clip opens with Coley looking sad as she rides a bike through a suburban neighborhood with cuts on her face. Coley gets the cuts after Sonya's boyfriend catches them almost kissing by the pool and physically assaults her in a rage. Before the altercation takes place, Coley and Sonya hang out as friends. They smoke together at Sonya's house and Coley watches adoringly as Sonya dances freely in an outdoor open space. They exchange knowing looks and long stares as they change into swimsuits before the pool party. Another day, as Sonya is sitting by the pool, Coley approaches her and sits by her. They try to kiss, but Sonya's boyfriend assaults them. After Coley is hit by the boyfriend, she jumps on him as he yells at Sonya and continues punching him until Sonya manages to tear her off of him. The two finally kiss, and the video concludes with Coley riding happily on her bike in the same suburban neighborhood from the first scene.

Critical reception 
In 2019, Billboard included the song in its list of the "30 Lesbian Love Songs".

Track listings 
Digital download (Remixes)
"Girls Like Girls" (Jenaux Remix)  – 3:53
"Girls Like Girls" (Oski Remix)  – 3:44
"Girls Like Girls" (Kuga Remix)  – 2:56
"Girls Like Girls" (Vali Remix)  – 3:45

Certifications

References 

2015 songs
Electropop songs
Hayley Kiyoko songs
Lesbian feminist mass media
Lesbian-related songs
2015 singles